Mount Burke is a summit in Alberta, Canada.

Mount Burke has the name of D. C. Burke, a former cattleman in the area.  Mr. Burke was also an officer of the North-West Mounted Police.

References

Burke
Alberta's Rockies